Omega Strikers is an upcoming free-to-play action sport video game, developed and published by Odyssey Interactive. The game features short, three-on-three online multiplayer matches, in which players compete to score more goals than the opposing team. It is scheduled for release on April 27, 2023, on Microsoft Windows, Nintendo Switch, iOS and Android.

Gameplay
Matches in Omega Strikers consist of two teams of three players, who fight to score by sending the Core, a large hockey puck, into the opponent's goal. The game is presented from a top-down perspective, with the whole playfield visible at once. 

Players can choose from a cast of characters, known as Strikers. Each Striker has a unique set of abilities which can be used to attack enemy players, move the Core, buff your allies, debuff your enemies, and more. When a character takes damage, their stagger bar increases, which makes it easier for their opponents to knock them back, or even off the field entirely for a short duration. Through interactions like scoring goals, knocking out enemies, making saves, etc., you would obtain experience points that can power up your strikers throughout the game.

Development
Omega Strikers is developed and self-published by Odyssey Interactive, a studio composed of former staff of Riot Games.

The game entered a closed beta testing phase on 16 September 2022, and transitioned to an open beta shortly after.

References

Action video games
Android (operating system) games
Air hockey video games
Free-to-play video games
IOS games
Multiplayer online games
Science fiction video games
Sports video games
Strategy video games
Unreal Engine games
Upcoming video games scheduled for 2023
Video games developed in Canada
Video games with cross-platform play
Windows games